El Maestro Custodio is believed to have been a 14th-century Benedictine monk living in the city of Oviedo in Asturias, Spain. He is believed to have written a history of Asturias, now lost but cited by several later historians.

Notes

14th-century births
Spanish Christian monks
Spanish male writers
Year of death unknown
14th-century Castilians